KSEO (750 AM) is a radio station airing a classic hits format licensed to Durant, Oklahoma.  The station serves the areas of Durant, Oklahoma, and Denison, Texas, and is owned by Kinion Whittington, through licensee Mid-Continental Broadcasting, LLC. KSEO operates only during daytime hours. It is one of few radio stations with a daytime power less than 250 watts. They are also on translator K231CE 94.1 FM in Durant, Oklahoma. This station primarily plays hits from the 1950s to the 1990s.

Translators

References

External links
KSEO's official website

Classic hits radio stations in the United States
SEO
Radio stations established in 1947
1947 establishments in Oklahoma
SEO